Ottavio Morgia (18 September 1920 – 30 August 1984) was an Italian football forward and later manager.

References

1920 births
1984 deaths
Footballers from Rome
Italian footballers
S.S. Lazio players
U.S. Siracusa players
S.S.C. Napoli players
U.S. Viterbese 1908 players
A.C.N. Siena 1904 players
U.S. Avellino 1912 players
Cagliari Calcio players
Serie A players
Association football forwards
Italian football managers
Cagliari Calcio managers
A.C.N. Siena 1904 managers
S.S. Chieti Calcio managers